In mathematics, the Hartogs–Rosenthal theorem is a classical result in complex analysis on the uniform approximation of continuous functions on compact subsets of the complex plane by rational functions. The theorem was proved in 1931 by the German mathematicians Friedrich Hartogs and Arthur Rosenthal and has been widely applied, particularly in operator theory.

Statement
The Hartogs–Rosenthal theorem states that if K is a compact subset of the complex plane with Lebesgue measure zero, then any continuous complex-valued function on K can be uniformly approximated by rational functions.

Proof

So it suffices to show that  can be uniformly approximated by a rational function on K.

Let g(z) be a smooth function of compact support on C equal to 1 on K and set

By the generalized Cauchy integral formula

since K has measure zero.

See also
Runge's theorem
Mergelyan's theorem

Notes

References

Rational functions
Theorems in approximation theory
Theorems in complex analysis